Clinton Harold Brown (July 8, 1903 – December 31, 1955) was a professional baseball player.

He was a right-handed pitcher over parts of fifteen seasons (1928–1942) with the Cleveland Indians and Chicago White Sox. For his career, he compiled an 89–93 record in 434 appearances, mostly as a relief pitcher, with a 4.26 earned run average and 410 strikeouts.

As a hitter, Brown was better than average, posting a .199 batting average (91-for-457) with 42 runs, 2 home runs, 46 RBI and 45 bases on balls. Defensively, he was better than average, recording a .975 fielding percentage which was 20 points higher than the league average at his position.

In 1939, Brown finished 11th in the voting for American League Most Valuable Player.

See also
 List of Major League Baseball annual saves leaders

External links

1903 births
1955 deaths
Cleveland Indians players
Chicago White Sox players
Major League Baseball pitchers
Baseball players from Pennsylvania
Harrisburg Senators players
Rochester Tribe players
New Orleans Pelicans (baseball) players